Peter Lachlan Cochran (born 28 January 1945) is a former Australian politician. He was the National Party member for Monaro in the New South Wales Legislative Assembly from 1988 to 1998. In recent years he has been known for his ongoing lobbying to keep feral horses (known as brumbies in Australia) within the Kosciusko National Park.

Cochran was born in Albury in New South Wales. He enlisted in the Army in 1965 and was sent to Vietnam in 1969, returning in 1970. He left the main force in 1972, and was a reservist from 1977 to 1979. Commissioned as a Justice of the Peace, he farmed near Adaminaby after leaving the armed forces and became involved in the National Party.

In 1987 he stood unsuccessfully as the National candidate for the federal seat of Eden-Monaro, but came third after Labor MP Jim Snow and Liberal candidate David Evans, obtaining 16.4% of the vote. Nevertheless, this was a large increase from the 1984 result of 3.9%. In 1988, Cochran was selected as the Nationals' candidate for the state seat of Monaro, previously a marginal Labor seat. Cochran defeated sitting member John Akister and also warded off an attempt by the Liberal Party to win the seat. In parliament he acted as liaison between the parliamentary party and the Young Nationals. He was known for opposing the creation of new national parks and backing the four-wheel drive lobby to access existing ones. He was re-elected in 1991 and 1995, the latter coming even as the Coalition lost government. During his final term, he was Monaro's first opposition member in 65 years. He resigned from parliament on 26 October 1998, shortly before the 1999 election.

In 2001, Cochran returned to politics as an independent candidate for the federal seat of Eden-Monaro, one of several independents to stand in that election. He'd represented most of the eastern portion of the seat at the state level for almost a decade. Cochran came third behind the Liberal and Labor candidates, with 8.2% of the vote.

In 2018 Cochran runs commercial horse treks through the Kosciuscko National Park. He has been lobbying for feral horses to remain in the park, and was under scrutiny in May 2018 after it was discovered he and his wife had donated more than $10,000 to the Nationals leader John Barilaro, who had put a bill through parliament listing feral horses in NSW as having heritage significance. Cochran also claimed to have helped create the legislation, causing controversy due to his business having a vested interest in keeping feral horses within the Kosciuscko National Park.

References

 

1945 births
Living people
National Party of Australia members of the Parliament of New South Wales
Members of the New South Wales Legislative Assembly